Mathias Ewen (born 15 January 1941) is a Luxembourgian footballer. He played in seven matches for the Luxembourg national football team from 1964 to 1968.

References

External links
 

1941 births
Living people
Luxembourgian footballers
Luxembourg international footballers
Place of birth missing (living people)
Association football defenders
CA Spora Luxembourg players
Union Luxembourg players